Pikey (also spelled pikie, pykie ) is a slang term, which is pejorative and considered by many to be a slur. It is used mainly in the United Kingdom and in Ireland - north and south - to refer to people who are of the Traveller community, a set of ethno-cultural groups found primarily in Great Britain and Ireland. It is also used against Romanichal Travellers, Welsh Kale, Scottish Lowland Travellers, Scottish Highland Travellers, and Funfair Travellers.

It is not well received among Irish Travellers or British Romany Travellers, as it is considered an ethnic slur.

Etymology 
The term "pikey" is possibly derived from "pike" which, c. 1520, meant "highway" and is related to the words turnpike (toll road) and pikeman (toll collector). Another possible etymology is that it derives from the Old English verb pikka (meaning to peck, pick or steal) which became piken in Middle English, before falling out of use. Part of its meaning survives in modern Dutch pikken, meaning to steal as well as in the old French slang "piquer", to snatch, to steal. In Robert Henryson's Fable Collection (late 15th century), in the fable of the Two Mice, the thieving mice are referred to on more than one occasion as "pykeris":

And in the samin thay went, but mair abaid,
Withoutin fyre or candill birnand bricht
For commonly sic pykeris luffis not lycht.

And together they went, but more about, 
without fire or candle burning bright
For commonly, such thieves do not like light.

19th century and 20th century
Charles Dickens in 1837 writes disparagingly of itinerant pike-keepers.

The Oxford English Dictionary traced the earliest use of "pikey" to The Times in August 1838, which referred to strangers who had come to the Isle of Sheppey as "pikey-men". In 1847, J. O. Halliwell in his Dictionary of Archaic and Provincial Words recorded the use of "pikey" to mean a gypsy. In 1887, W. D. Parish and W. F. Shaw in the Dictionary of Kentish Dialect recorded the use of the word to mean "a turnpike traveller; a vagabond; and so generally a low fellow".

Its Kentish usage became more widespread, as it was also used to include all of the travelling groups who came to the county as "pickers" in the summertime of fruit and hops.

Thomas Acton's Gypsy Politics and Social Change notes John Camden Hotten's Slang Dictionary (1887) as similarly stating:

Hotten's dictionary of slang gives pike at as go away and Pikey as a tramp or a Gypsy. He continues a pikey-cart is, in various parts of the country, one of those habitable vehicles suggestive of country life. Possibly the term has some reference to those who continually use the pike or turnpike road.

The Journal of the Gypsy Lore Society similarly agrees the term pikey solely applied (negatively) to Romani people.

Contemporary usage

Pikey remained, as of 1989, common prison slang for Romani people or those who have a similar lifestyle of itinerant unemployment and travel. More recently, pikey was applied to Irish Travellers (other slurs include tinkers and knackers) and non-Romanichal travellers. In the late 20th century, it came to be used to describe "a lower-class person, regarded as coarse or disreputable."

Pikey's most common contemporary use is not as a term for the Romani ethnic group, but as a catch-all phrase to refer to people, of any ethnic group, who travel around with no fixed abode. Among English Romani Gypsies the term pikey refers to a Traveller who is not of Romani descent. It may also refer to a member who has been cast out of the family.

In the late 20th and early 21st centuries, the definition became even looser and is sometimes used to refer to a wide section of the (generally urban) underclass of the country (in England generally known as chavs), or merely a person of any social class who "lives on the cheap" such as a bohemian. It is also used as an adjective, e.g. "a pikey estate" or "a pikey pub". Following complaints from Travellers' groups about racism, when the term was used by presenter Jeremy Clarkson as a pun for Pike's Peak in the television programme Top Gear, the Editorial Standards Committee of the BBC Trust ruled that, in this instance, the term merely meant "cheap". In doing so, it justified the ascribed meaning by quoting the Wikipedia article for the term.

Negative English attitudes towards "pikeys" were a running theme in the 2000 Guy Ritchie film Snatch.

In 2003 the Firle Bonfire Society burned an effigy of a family of gypsies inside a caravan after travellers damaged local land. The number plate on the caravan read "P1KEY". A storm of protests and accusations of racism rapidly followed. Twelve members of the society were arrested but the Crown Prosecution Service decided that there was insufficient evidence to proceed on a charge of "incitement to racial hatred".

The Oxford History of English refers to:

"Ned" is a Scottish usage that perhaps derives from the diminutive for the name Edward. The current usage dates from the 1930s, but the Oxford English Dictionary refers to its use for "hooligan" or "lout" in the 19th century.

See also
 Chav
 Didicoy
 New Age travellers
 Trailer trash

References

Sources

External links

 Anger over "pikey" slur (BBC News)
 Davidson exits after TV gay row (BBC News) — use of "pikey" by Marco Pierre White
 How offensive is the word "pikey"? (BBC News)
 Brundle escapes punishment for "pikey" comment (Planet F1)

Antiziganism in the United Kingdom
British slang
Class-related slurs
English words
Ethnic and religious slurs
Irish Travellers
Romani in the United Kingdom
Youth culture in the United Kingdom